The 1961 World Table Tennis Championships were held in Peking from April 5 to April 14, 1961.

Medalists

Team

Individual

References

External links
ITTF Museum

 
World Table Tennis Championships
World Table Tennis Championships
Table tennis competitions in China
Table
Sports competitions in Beijing
April 1961 sports events in Asia
1961 in Chinese sport